NSIA may refer to:
National Statistics and Information Authority (Afghanistan)
Nigeria Sovereign Investment Authority
Norwegian Safety Investigation Authority